Kazimierz Łyszczyński (4 March 1634  – 30 March 1689), also known in English as Casimir Liszinski, was a Polish nobleman, philosopher, and soldier in the ranks of the Sapieha family, who was accused, tried, and executed for atheism in 1689.

For eight years he studied philosophy as a Jesuit and then became a podsędek (supply judge) in legal cases against the Jesuits concerning estates. He wrote a treatise entitled On the non-existence of God and was later executed on charges of atheism. His trial has been criticised and is seen as a case of legalised religious murder in Poland.

Life

Education and work 

Kazimierz Łyszczyński was born in Łyszczyce, in what is now Brest District, Brest Region, Belarus. He became a nobleman, landowner, philosopher, and soldier in the service of the Sapieha family. For eight years he studied philosophy as a Jesuit, but left the order and then became a supply judge (podsędek) in legal cases against the Jesuits concerning estates. He was also member of the Sejm of the Polish–Lithuanian Commonwealth.

Łyszczyński had read a book by Henry Aldsted entitled Theologia Naturalis, which attempted to prove the existence of divinity. But its arguments were so confused that Łyszczyński was able to infer many contradictions. Ridiculing Aldsted, Łyszczyński wrote in the book's margins the words "ergo non-est Deus" ("therefore God does not exist").

This was discovered by one of Łyszczyński's debtors, Jan Kazimierz Brzoska, who was the nuncio of Brest in Poland or a Stolnik of Bracławice or Łowczy of Brześć. Brzoska, reluctant to return a great sum of money lent him by Łyszczyński, accused the latter of being an atheist and gave the aforementioned work as evidence to Witwicki, bishop of Poznań. Brzoska also stole and delivered to the court a handwritten copy of De non-existentia Dei, which was the first Polish philosophical treatise presenting reality from an atheistic perspective, and which Łyszczyński had been working on since 1674.

Trial 
Witwicki along with Załuski, bishop of Kiev, took up this case with zeal. King John III Sobieski attempted to help Łyszczyński by ordering that he should be judged at Vilnius, but this could not save Łyszczyński from the clergy. Łyszczyński's first privilege as a Polish noble, that he could not be imprisoned before his condemnation, was violated. The Łyszczyński case was brought before the diet of 1689 where he was accused of having denied the existence of God and having blasphemed against the Virgin Mary and the saints. He was condemned to death for atheism.

Execution 

The sentence was carried out before noon in the Old Town Market Place in Warsaw, where his tongue was pulled out followed by a beheading. After that, his corpse was transported beyond the city borders and cremated.

Bishop Załuski gave the following account of the execution:

De non-existentia Dei
Łyszczyński wrote a treatise, De non-existentia Dei (On the non-existence of God), stating that God does not exist and that religions are inventions of man.

On the basis of a public denunciation, a trial was conducted before a Sejm commission. There is an actual transcript of the proceedings at the Kórnik library, including a speech by the Grand Duchy of Lithuania Instigator Regni Szymon Kurowicz Zabistowski, citing fragments of De non-existentia Dei. The treatise itself was destroyed by the Sejm, but the surviving cited fragments are as follows:

I – we beseech you, o' theologians, by your God, if in this manner do you not extinguish the light of Reason, do you not oust the sun from this world, do you not pull down your God from the sky, when attributing to him the impossible, whereof the characteristics and attributes contradict themselves.

II – Man is the creator of God, and God is a concept and creation of Man. Hence people are the architects and engineers of God, and God is not a true being but a being existing only within the mind; being chimeric by its nature, because a God and a chimera are the same thing.

III – Religion was constituted by people without religion, so they could be worshipped although the God is not existent. Piety was introduced by the unpietic. The fear of God was spread by the unafraid so that the people were afraid of them in the end. Devotion named godly is a design of Man. Doctrine, be it logical or philosophical, bragging to be teaching the truth of God, is false, and on the contrary, the one condemned as false, is the very true one.

IV – simple folk are cheated by the more cunning with the fabrication of God for their own oppression; whereas the same oppression is shielded by the folk in a way, that if the wise attempted to free them by the truth, they would be quelled by the very people.

V – nevertheless we do not experience within us and within any other such an imperative of reason, which would ensure us of a truth of divine revelation. Alas if they were present in us, then everyone would have to acknowledge them and would have no doubts and would not contradict the Writings of Moses and the Gospels – which is not true – and there would be no different congregations and their followers as Mahomet etc. Such an imperative is not known and there are not only doubts, but there are some who deny a revelation, and they are not fools, but wise men, who with a proper reasoning prove what? the very contrary, what I also prove here. Concluding, that God does not exist".During his trial, Łyszczyński claimed that the work was to be about a Catholic and an atheist having a debate, in which the Catholic would eventually win (he told the diet that the work would have had a different title from De non-existentia Dei). The atheist was to speak first followed by the Catholic. He claimed that he only wrote the first half of the work (that is only the atheist's argument) and then stopped writing at the advice of a priest.

Status in modern Poland
Regardless of whether Łyszczyński was genuinely an atheist, in communist Poland he came to be celebrated as a martyr to the atheist cause. In a series of papers, the philosopher Andrzej Nowicki presented a romanticized view of Łyszczyński, stating that "in terms of breadth of intellectual horizons, thoroughness of philosophical erudition, and boldness of thought, he was beyond doubt the most eminent Polish mind of the age."

According to Pomian, "It appears that Łyszczyński was sentenced to death for writing a treatise entitled 'De non-existentia Dei' ... and all that remains are a few notes which were made during the trial. Apart from this and also the fact that his execution caused some controversy at the time on account of his being a member of the gentry, next to nothing is known about Łyszczyński. Łyszczyński's importance as a martyr of the atheist cause has led to his romanticization by Nowicki and to his rescue from a murky cell in the obscure by-ways of history. A copious amount of writing has appeared concerning both what is not known about him and what the content of his thought might have been. Nowicki writes boldly: 'Polish intellectual life cannot boast of any one figure who could compare with Łyszczyński in terms of breadth of intellectual horizons, the thoroughness of philosophical erudition and the boldness of thought. He was beyond doubt the most eminent Polish mind of the epoch.' What a pity that no one knows what the content of his thought was. According to the notes made at the trial, Łyszczyński, was curiously 'modern', even to the point of incongruity, in his critique of religion: all of his remarks might have been made by Marx or Lenin ... Łyszczyński clearly states his disbelief in God. The incongruity of this idea, however, lies in an inability to understand its genesis in the context of Polish society at that time ...  there is no independent or clear evidence of other individuals with similar inclinations during Łyszczyński's time. To say that Łyszczyński was simply ahead of his time means nothing: it is an admission of the unavailability of an explanation."

In March 2014, his persona and ideas were the key theme in a public performance during the 2014 Procession of Atheists in Poland, during which his execution was reenacted.

 See also 

 Enlightenment in Poland
 History of philosophy in Poland
 Irreligion in Poland
 Religion in Lithuania
 Religion in Belarus
 Religion in Poland

Citations and footnotes

References

 L. Łyszczinskij, Rod dworian Łyszczinskich, S. Pietierburg 1907.
 A. Nowicki, Pięć fragmentów z dzieła "De non-existentia dei" Kazimierza Łyszczyńskiego (by a script fromLibrary of Kórnik nr 443), "Euhemer", nr 1, 1957, pp. 72–81.
 A. Nowicki, Aparatura pojęciowa rozważań Kazimierza Łyszczyńskiego (1634–1689) o religii i stosunkach między ludźmi, "Euhemer, Zeszyty Filozoficzne", nr 3, 1962, pp. 53–81.
 A. Nowicki, Studia nad Łyszczyńskim, "Euhemer, Zeszyty Filozoficzne", nr 4, 1963, pp. 22–83.
 A. Nowicki, Pięć wiadomości o Łyszczyńskim w gazecie paryskiej z roku 1689, "Euhemer, Zeszyty Filozoficzne", nr 4, 1963, pp. 40–44.
 A. Nowicki, Sprawa Kazimierza Łyszczyńskiego na Sejmie w Warszawie w świetle rękopisu Diariusza Sejmowego, znajdującego się w Wojewódzkim Archiwum Państwowym w Gdańsku, "Euhemer, Zeszyty Filozoficzne", nr 4, 1963, pp. 23–39.
 Ateizm Kazimierza Łyszczyńskiego, (w:) A. Nowicki, Wykłady o krytyce religii w Polsce, Warszawa 1965, pp. 51–68.
 Janusz Tazbir, Historia Kościoła katolickiego w Polsce (1460 -1795)'', Warsaw 1966.

External links
 A. Nowicki: Kazimierz Łyszczyński, Towarzystwo Krzewienia Kultury Świeckiej, Łódź 1989, p. 80.
 Kazimierz Łyszczyński's Web List of Atheists and Agnostics

1634 births
1689 deaths
Atheist philosophers
Belarusian atheists
Belarusian philosophers
Executed Belarusian people
People executed for heresy
People executed by the Polish–Lithuanian Commonwealth
People executed by Poland by decapitation
People from Brest District
Polish atheists
Former Jesuits
Executed Polish people
Persecution of atheists
17th-century atheists
17th-century Polish philosophers